At least 279 Eamon adventures have been released since the debut of Eamon circa 1980.

Adventures
The following list of officially recognized and publicly-available Eamon adventures is drawn principally from the Eamon Wiki. The EDX column indicates the number assigned by Eamon Deluxe.  Release dates generally indicate when the adventure was first announced as being publicly available.

References

External links
Adventures List at Eamon Wiki
Adventures List at Eamon Adventurers Guild Online
Eamon Deluxe Adventures List at Eamon Adventurers Guild Online

Eamon
Apple II-only games
Eamon
Eamon